The Jalapeno Golf Classic was an annual golf tournament for professional women golfers on the Futures Tour, the LPGA Tour's developmental tour. The event was part of the Futures Tour's schedule from 2005 to 2008. It took place at Palm View Golf Course in McAllen, Texas.

The tournament was a 54-hole event, as are most Futures Tour tournaments, and included pre-tournament pro-am opportunities, in which local amateur golfers can play with the professional golfers from the Tour as a benefit for local charities. The benefiting charity for the Jalapeno Golf Classic was the McAllen Hispanic Chamber of Commerce.

At the 2008 tournament, 17-year-old Vicky Hurst broke the Futures Tour's 54-hole scoring record, shooting an 18-under-par 198. The record had previously been held by Grace Park, who shot 16-under at a tournament in 1999.

Winners

Tournament records

References

External links
Futures Tour official website

Former Symetra Tour events
Golf in Texas